Teyber is a surname.

The most prominent people with the surname were an Austrian family of musicians. They also spelled their name many different ways, including Deiber, Taiber, Taube, Tauber, Täuber, Tayber, Teiber, and Teuber. Notable members of this family include:
 (c. 1711-1785), violinist and court musician
Anton Teyber (1756–1822), organist, pianist, Kapellmeister and composer, son of Matthäus
Elena Asachi, née Teyber, (1789-1877), pianist, singer and composer, daughter of Anton
Franz Teyber (1758–1810), Austrian organist, Kapellmeister and composer, son of Matthäus
Elisabeth Teyber (1744-1816), operatic soprano, daughter of Matthäus
Therese Teyber (1760-1830), operatic soprano, daughter of Matthäus 
Andreas Teuber (1942–2021), American philosophy professor and actor

References

See also
 Tauber (surname)
 Taubes (surname)
Teuber (surname)

German-language surnames